The United States Senate election in Washington of 1952 was held on November 4, 1952. Incumbent and highly-controversial Republican Harry Cain ran for a second term in office, but was defeated by Democratic U.S. Representative Henry M. Jackson. Jackson served 30 years as a United States Senator.

Blanket primary

Candidates

Democratic
Henry M. Jackson, U.S. Representative from Everett

Republican
Harry Cain, incumbent U.S. Senator since 1946
Carl Viking Holman
Ed F. Oldfield

Results

General election

Results

See also 
 1952 United States Senate elections

References

1952
Washington
United States Senate